Anthony LaPaglia (born 31 January 1959) is an Australian actor. He is best known for his role as Jack Malone in the television drama Without a Trace (2002–2009), for which he received a Golden Globe Award in 2004.

LaPaglia won a Primetime Emmy Award for his role as Simon Moon in the television sitcom Frasier (2000–2004). He has also appeared in films such as Betsy's Wedding (1990), Empire Records (1995), Autumn in New York (2000), Lantana (2001), Balibo (2009), Holding the Man (2015), Annabelle: Creation (2017), and Nitram (2021), the lattermost of which earned him an AACTA Award.

Early life
LaPaglia was born in Adelaide, South Australia, the son of Maria Johannes (née Brendel), a secretary and model, and Gedio "Eddie" LaPaglia (deceased), an auto mechanic and car dealer. LaPaglia's mother was Dutch, and his father emigrated from Bovalino, Calabria, Italy, at the age of eighteen. His younger brother, Jonathan LaPaglia, is also an actor, and his other brother, Michael, is a car wholesaler in Los Angeles. LaPaglia attended Rostrevor College and Norwood High School.

LaPaglia was working in Adelaide as a shoe salesman for Florsheim Shoes in the early 1980s. He asked to be transferred to the US and continued working there while studying acting as he was rejected by the prestigious Sydney drama school NIDA. LaPaglia first began his venture into dramatic art in his late teens, when he enrolled in an acting course at the South Australian Castings Agency (SA Castings) in Adelaide. The two-and-half-year course was to be supplemented with a further three months, which would have included a "boot camp" and a trial listing with SA Castings. After completing one-and-a-half years of the course, LaPaglia left Adelaide for Los Angeles.

Career

LaPaglia's earliest credit was a 1985 part in an episode of the television series Steven Spielberg's Amazing Stories. His first feature film was Cold Steel in 1987, followed that same year by the title role of Frank Nitti in the telemovie Nitti: The Enforcer. LaPaglia had a supporting role as a mobster in the minor hit Betsy's Wedding (1990).

He starred alongside Danny Aiello and Lainie Kazan in 29th Street, a fact-based comedy/bio-pic, as the first New York State Lottery winner, Frank Pesce Jr. This was followed by roles in the vampire/Mafia story Innocent Blood (1992), the comedy thriller So I Married an Axe Murderer (1993), the legal thriller The Client (1994), and the comedy Empire Records in 1995. That same year, LaPaglia appeared in the role of Jimmy Wyler, lead character in the TV series Murder One, during its second and final season.

During 1997–98, LaPaglia appeared in a Broadway production of Arthur Miller's A View From the Bridge with the Roundabout Theatre Company and later received a Tony Award for his portrayal of the protagonist, Eddie Carbone. LaPaglia also played Tito Merelli in Ken Ludwig's Lend Me a Tenor on Broadway. Before A View From the Bridge opened, LaPaglia was sent a script for the pilot of The Sopranos and met its creator, David Chase, to discuss the role of protagonist Tony Soprano. However, various factors, including Fox and his Broadway role, prevented LaPaglia from obtaining the role.

Spike Lee cast LaPaglia as a New York police detective in Summer of Sam (1999). During 2000–04, LaPaglia appeared in eight episodes of the sitcom Frasier, including the finale, playing Daphne Moon's brother Simon. The role won him an Emmy Award for "Outstanding Guest Actor in a Comedy Series".

LaPaglia made his debut in an Australian production opposite Hugo Weaving in The Custodian (1993). The following year he appeared in the romantic comedy Paperback Romance (1994) with Gia Carides, whom he later married. He continued to live mainly in Los Angeles, returning occasionally—especially from about 2000—for roles in major Australian films such as Looking for Alibrandi (2000), Lantana (2001), The Bank (2001), Happy Feet (2006), $9.99 (2008), Balibo (2009) and Happy Feet Two (2011).

In 2002, LaPaglia co-starred as a fire captain opposite Sigourney Weaver in The Guys, a film about New York firemen who died in the World Trade Center. He also played the role onstage, rotating with Bill Murray and others. "We did it as a tribute to the men," said LaPaglia. "I've been so lucky to do it, to be part of this experience. But I can't go back to that morning or watch the video. It's too painful." He also played fictional Australian actor Anthony Bella (who played Nicky Caesar in the fictitious series Little Caesar) in the comedy movie Analyze That, but was uncredited in his role.

In addition to playing the central character in Without a Trace during 2002–09, LaPaglia co-wrote an episode entitled "Deep Water".

In 2009, LaPaglia played the part of Roger East, a real-life Australian journalist, in the political thriller Balibo, about the killing in 1975 of five Australian journalists by the Indonesian Army in the town of Balibo, East Timor. The opening scene depicts East's own summary execution, during the Indonesian invasion.

In October 2011 it was announced that LaPaglia would join the cast of Quentin Tarantino's new film Django Unchained, in which he would portray an Australian character once again. However, he eventually left the project, calling the production "out of control."

On 18 February 2012, it was announced that LaPaglia would star in the ABC drama pilot Americana. The show was not picked up.

It was announced in May 2013 that LaPaglia signed on in the feature adaptation of Stephen King's A Good Marriage with Joan Allen.

In March 2014, LaPaglia joined a new CBS terrorism drama pilot titled Red Zone starring as a retired CIA operative and current high school football coach who returns to active duty after a terrorist attack in Washington, D.C. It was renamed Field of Play and not picked up for the 2014 season.

From about 2012, LaPaglia began accepting work in Australia more frequently. Following major roles in Underground (2012) (a biopic about Julian Assange and the comedy Mental (2012), LaPaglia had a supporting role in the Neil Armfield's Australian romantic-drama film Holding the Man, as Bob Caleo. The 2015 film stars Ryan Corr and Craig Stott, with supporting performances from LaPaglia, Guy Pearce and Geoffrey Rush. Holding the Man was adapted from Timothy Conigrave's 1995 memoir of the same name. For his role within the film, LaPaglia was nominated for an AACTA Award for Best Actor in a Supporting Role at the 5th AACTA Awards in 2015. In that year LaPaglia returned to his home city, Adelaide, to star in A Month of Sundays as Frank, a miserable real estate agent who finds solace and redemption in a chance friendship with an elderly woman (played by Julia Blake) who reminds him of his mother. In 2016 he appeared in his first Australian TV series: The Code, a political thriller set against rising geopolitical tensions between the US and China. The following year he starred in the four-part miniseries Sunshine, set in the western Melbourne suburb of the same name, playing the role of mentor to a promising young Sudanese-Australian soccer player. And in 2018, LaPaglia appeared in the fifth season of the comedy Rake, based loosely on the life and misadventures of Charles Waterstreet.

In 2017, LaPaglia played Vito Rizzuto in the Simon Barry Canadian TV series Bad Blood, which aired on Citytv, in French on ICI Radio-Canada.

In 2017 starred in Sunshine, an Australian crime drama series screened on SBS from Wednesday 18 October 2017. The four-part miniseries is an Essential Media production, directed by Daina Reid and written by Matt Cameron and Elise McCredie.

From 2017, stars in veteran filmmaker Neil Jordan's sumptuous series Riviera. Set in the French Riviera, the series follows Georgina Clios, a midwestern art curator whose life is turned upside down after the death of her billionaire husband Constantine Clios (LaPaglia) in a yacht accident. Georgina becomes immersed in a world of lies, double-dealing and crime, as she seeks to uncover the truth about her husband's death.

Personal life
LaPaglia currently lives in Santa Monica, California. He has said that he adopted an American accent to help him get acting work after moving to the US. His current accent is neither distinctly American nor is it Australian, but, rather, a combination of both. According to an offhand remark by LaPaglia, he has employed an American accent since 1982. LaPaglia is the godfather of Poppy Montgomery and Adam Kaufman's son, Jackson. LaPaglia's first marriage was to actress Cherie Michan. His second marriage was to actress Gia Carides, whom he met at a party; the two starred in the 1994 Australian movie Paperback Romance (a.k.a. Lucky Break) and married in 1998. Their daughter Bridget was born in January 2003. In April 2015, newspapers reported that LaPaglia and Carides had split after 17 years. He married Alexandra Henkel (his third marriage), who is 18 years younger, on 28 April 2018.

Life in soccer
In the 1980s, LaPaglia was a goalkeeper in the National Soccer League, playing for Adelaide City and West Adelaide. LaPaglia was part owner of A-League club Sydney FC until 2008; flying from California to Sydney to attend their matches since their inception in 2005. He was the narrator and executive producer of The Away Game, a critically acclaimed television documentary exploring the experiences of Australian soccer players in Europe.

He plays occasionally with Hollywood United, an amateur organisation of which he is club president, with others in the entertainment industry including Frank Leboeuf, Vinnie Jones, Steve Jones (of the Sex Pistols) and others.

LaPaglia has a minority shareholding in the International Goalkeepers Academy. The Academy was founded and is operated by James Fraser, who represented the Australian national team leading up to the 1974 FIFA World Cup.

LaPaglia has volunteered as an actor with the Young Storytellers Program. He played in a charity soccer match in 2007 to raise funds for Southern California wildfire relief.

Filmography

Awards and nominations

References

External links

 
 
 
 
 Anthony LaPaglia Bio at CBS – Without a Trace
 ABC TV Enough Rope Interview with Andrew Denton
 Anthony LaPaglia speaks to The Riviera Times

1959 births
People educated at Rostrevor College
Adelaide City FC players
Australian expatriate male actors in the United States
Australian male film actors
Australian male voice actors
Australian soccer players
Australian people of Dutch descent
Australian people of Italian descent
Australian male television actors
Best Actor AACTA Award winners
Best Drama Actor Golden Globe (television) winners
Drama Desk Award winners
Australian people of Calabrian descent
Primetime Emmy Award winners
Hollywood United players
Living people
Male actors from Adelaide
Male actors from Santa Monica, California
Tony Award winners
West Adelaide SC players
20th-century Australian male actors
21st-century Australian male actors
Soccer players from Santa Monica, California
Association football goalkeepers